The OSE class 220, also known as DE2000 or Marlboro, due to the coloring of the front, reminiscent of the packaging colors of the homonymous tobacco industry, is a series of diesel-electric locomotives operated by TRAINOSE and RCLG and is part of the OSE fleet. It was built in 1998 at the ADTranz (and later Bombardier) factories in Kassel, Germany, as the A.471 series, but in 2003 OSE acquired another batch. The locomotives were put into operation by OSE after the completion of their construction.

In total, there are 36 such locomotives, numbered 220 001-220 036, of which the first 26 were originally numbered A.471-A.496. All of the locomotives were designed by the manufacturers while the final assembly was made in Oerlikon, Switzerland. They are designed for intercity trains, high-speed trains as well as freight trains.

They are based on the Octeon model of ADtranz, and feature similar features to the Italian E412 and PKP EU43, and have the same engines (MTU 12V396TC13) with the AEG DE IC-2000N.

Route 

Class 220 serves long-distance express trains on the Piraeus-Thessaloniki line, in the section from Athens to Paleofarsalos, on trains 50, 51, 55, 56, 58, 59, 60 and 61, and in the section from Tithorea to Paleofarsalos, on trains 52 and 53, and in the Paleoparsalos-Kalampaka line.

List 
The following table summarizes the class:

History

1990s: delivery to OSE 
In 1998,  OSE began to receive the Adtranz DE2000 diesel locomotives, which were ordered at a cost of DM 210 million in 1995. These dual-engine dual-cab locomotives were related to FS Class E.412 and EU43 series for PKP and were based on the Octeon platform. The MTU 12V396TC13 engine was virtually the same as that used in AEG/LEW-built InterCity DMUs (AEG DE IC-2000N) a decade ago, and this commonality was desirable; the engine pair delivered 2.1 MW (train heating could consume up to 500 KW of power from intermediate DC link as there was no separate head-end power generator).

The locomotives used steel from Poland's Pafawag, aluminium roof panels from Derby in the United Kingdom, AC motors and alternators from Adtranz Austria, while the bogies were Flexifloat (made in Kassel), also used in German InterCity Express. They were numbered A.471 to A.496.

2000s 
Later, an order for ten more locomotives (this time, in meter gauge and with 6 axles) for the Peloponnese network was converted to an order for ten normal 4-axle range from  Bombardier. The second batch was delivered in 2003-2004. In the same year, the gradual renovation of the older units began.

Appearance 

Colour scheme of the diesel-electric locomotives consists of a blue trapezoid within a white trapezoid, with cabs painted red and cab fronts having large white polygons (giving rise to the nickname "Marlboro," from resemblance to the well-known brand of cigarettes).

Sources 

 Transport/Trains/Locomotives
 Verelis: Presentation of the new OSE trains

References 

Diesel locomotives of Greece
OSE locomotives
Bo′Bo′ locomotives
Standard gauge locomotives of Greece